María Magdalena is a Mexican biographical television series produced by Sony Pictures Television and Dopamine for TV Azteca. It is a biblical drama based on the life of Mary Magdalene, and it stars María Fernanda Yepes as the titular character. The series is written by Lina Uribe, Darío Vanegas, and Jaqueline Vargas, and has the executive production of Daniel Ucros, and Juan Pablo Posada.

The start of production was confirmed on 30 January 2018, and 60 episodes were confirmed for the first season. It premiered first in Panama on TVN on 15 October 2018 and ended on 1 February 2019.

Cast 
 María Fernanda Yepes as Mary Magdalene
 Manolo Cardona as Jesus
 Andrés Parra as Pedro
 Luis Roberto Guzmán as Valerio
 Diana Lein as Herodías
 Cesar Mora as Herodes
 Pakey Vásquez as Barrabas
 Alejandro de Marino as Lázaro
 Gustavo Sánchez Parra as Cusas
 Jacqueline Arenal as Mary
 Claudio Cataño as Ur
 Andrés Suárez as Tribuno Emilio
 Danielle Arciniegas as Salome
 Juan Fernando Sánchez as Yair
 Juana Arboleda as Juana
 Juan Manuel Lenis as Andrew the Apostle
 Vicente Peña as Mateo
 Alejandro Buitrago as Santiago
 Maia Landaburu as Rebeca
 Luis Miguel González as John the Evangelist
 María Teresa Barreto as Abigail
 Anderson Balsero as Bartholomew the Apostle

References 

2018 Mexican television series debuts
2019 Mexican television series endings
Sony Pictures Television telenovelas
TVN (Panamanian TV network) original programming